Krishna Rao Voomaji Rao Ghorpade, better known as K. V. Ghorpade (March 17, 1919 – December 23, 1997) was an Indian pathologist.

He was born on 17 March 1919. After medical education, he worked under Dr. P. Krishna Rao and obtained Ph.D. from Victoria Hospital.

He has worked on the toxicity of Abrus precatorius on the maternal and fetal tissues, Kyasanur forest disease and South Indian Paraplegia.

He held many administrative jobs as member of various University boards, Vice Dean of K.M.C., Hubli and Dean of Kidwai Memorian Cancer Hospital, Bangalore.

He established the Pathology laboratories in Victoria Hospital, M. S. Ramaiah Medical College and St. Martha's Hospital.

Bibliography
 K. V. Ghorpade : Comparison of two commercial Meinicke Antigens, Report on the use of three different qualities of saline in the preparation of each antigen for serological testing. Bulletin of the World Health Organization, 1952, 5: 513–16.

References

Indian pathologists
1919 births
1997 deaths
Marathi people
20th-century Indian medical doctors